Bartholomeus or Bartholomaeus or Barthelomaeus is a masculine Latin given name, the Latin equivalent of Bartholomew. The German cognate is Bartholomäus. Notable people with the name include:

 Bartholomeus Amadeus degli Amidei (died 1266), Italian founder of the Servite Order
 Bartholomeus Amicus (1562–1649), Jesuit priest, teacher and writer who spent his adult life in Naples
 Bartholomeus Anglicus (1203–1272), scholastic scholar of Paris, member of the Franciscan order
 Bartholomeus Appelman (1628–1686), Dutch landscape painter
 Bartholomeus Assteyn (1607–1669/1677), Dutch still life painter
 Bartholomeus Barbiers (1743–1808), Dutch landscape painter
 Bartholomeus van Bassen (1590–1652), Dutch painter and architect
 Bartholomeus Jan "Bart" Bok (1906–1983), Dutch-born American astronomer
 Bartholomeus Breenbergh (1598–1657), Dutch painter
 Bartholomaeus of Bruges (died 1356), Flemish physician and natural philosopher
 Bartholomeus Dolendo (c. 1570 – 1626), Dutch engraver, draftsman and goldsmith
 Bartholomeus Eggers (c. 1637 – 1692), Flemish sculptor active in the Dutch Republic
 Bartholomeus Eustachius (died 1574), Italian anatomist
 Bartholomeus de Glanvilla (died c. 1360), English Franciscan friar
 Bartholomeus van der Helst (1613–1670), Dutch portrait painter
 Bartholomeus van Hove (1790–1880), Dutch painter and decorative artist
 Bartholomeus de Jager (fl. 1655), Dutch corsair
 Bartholomeus J.W.M. "Bart" van Hove (1850–1914), Dutch sculptor
 Bartholomeus Gabriel "Bart" le Roux (born 1994), South African rugby player
 Bartholomeus "Bart" de Ligt (1883–1938), Dutch anarcho-pacifist and antimilitarist
 Bartholomeus Maton (1641–aft.1684), Dutch painter active in Sweden
 Bartholomeus Meyburgh (1624–1708), Dutch portrait and history painter
 Bartholomeus Molenaer (1618–1650), Dutch genre painter
 Bartholomaeus of Neocastro (c.1240–aft.1293), Italian jurist and chronicler
 Bartholomaeus Pitiscus (1561–1613), German trigonometrist, astronomer and theologian
Jurickson Barthelomeus Profar (born 1993), Curaçaoan professional baseball infielder and outfielder
 Bartholomeus Roodenburch (1866–1939), Dutch swimmer
 Bartholomeus Ruloffs (1741–1801), Dutch conductor and composer
 Bartholomeus Spranger (1546–1611), Flemish Mannerist painter, draftsman, and etcher
 Bartholomaeus Stockmann (c. 1550 – 1609), Danish composer
 Bartholomeus Strobel (1591–1650), Silesian painter
 Bartholomeus V. Welser (1484–1561), German banker
 Bartholomeus VI. Welser (1512–1546), German explorer in Venezuela

See also 
 Bartholomeus saga postola, Old Norse account of the life of Saint Bartholomew

References 

Dutch masculine given names
Latin masculine given names